Cadra rugosa is a species of snout moth in the genus Cadra. It was described by Marianne Horak in 1994. It is found in central Australia.

The wingspan is 15–16 mm for males and females.

References

Phycitini
Moths described in 1994
Taxa named by Marianne Horak
Moths of Australia